USNS S. P. Lee was laid down on 27 June 1966 by the Defoe Shipbuilding Co., Bay City, Michigan as yard hull number 441. The ship, sponsored by Mrs. David Scull, great-granddaughter of Admiral Lee, was launched on 19 October 1967 and delivered to the navy on 2 December 1968.

Service history
Although she had originally been intended to operate under the Oceanographer of the Navy, on 10 September 1968, S. P. Lee was placed under sponsorship of the Naval Underwater Research and Development Center, San Diego, California. Commanded by Capt. Paul L. Sinski, Master, the ship sailed to the Mediterranean and operated out of Naples conducting environmental acoustics tests for the 6th Fleet. For the next four years, but for a period in ready reserve status (7 April to 14 August 1972), she continued to conduct hydrographic operations for the navy in both the Atlantic and Pacific. On 25 September 1970, the ship was reclassified AG-192. S. P. Lee was placed back in ready reserve status on 29 January 1973, and transferred to the United States Geological Survey (USGS) on 27 February 1974. The ship ranged from the Arctic to Antarctic on geology and geophysics missions for the agency.

S.P. Lee (T-AGS-31) was one of the new generation of oceanographic research ships designed and built for that purpose in the 1960s to replace early warship conversions. She is painted white, with the identifying Military Sealift Command funnel bands of black, gold, and blue. Her designation as a civilian-manned “U.S. Naval Ship,” rather than the “United States Ship” borne by commissioned navy ships, is spelled out on her bow. S.P. Lee's fantail is open to make room for heavy research equipment and the machinery needed to handle it.

The University of Hawaii operated the ship as RV Samuel P. Lee from 1983 to 1992 out of its Marine Expeditionary Center, Snug Harbor, Honolulu, Hawaii as part of the School of Ocean and Earth Science and Technology (SOEST) fleet.

S.P. Lee was returned to the U.S. Navy and struck from the naval register, 1 October 1992. She was transferred to Mexico, 7 December 1992 under the Security Assistance Program.

Mexican service
The ship became the Buques de Investigación Oceanográfica ARM Antares (BI-04) surveying for the Mexican navy. Antares, along with ARM. “Altair” (BI-03) (ex ) are listed as operational in 2019 and based in Veracruz.

See also

Footnotes

References

External links
 ESPECIFICACIONES DEL   BUQUE DE INVESTIGACIÓN OCEANOGRÁFICA ARM “ANTARES” (BI-04) (Photo & specifications as Antares)

Ships built in Bay City, Michigan
Oceanographic research ships of the United States Navy
1966 ships
Research vessels of the United States Navy
Ships transferred from the United States Navy to the Mexican Navy
Research vessels of the Mexican Navy